Fiat 500 is a car model produced from 1957 to 1975. Its model number is also used for several small cars manufactured by Fiat. All are known as the Fiat Cinquecento in their home market regardless of whether they are numerically badged or not.

 Fiat 500 "Topolino" – produced from 1936 to 1955
 Fiat 500 – produced from 1957 to 1975
 Fiat Cinquecento – produced from 1991 to 1998, succeeded by the Seicento
 Fiat 500 (2007) – produced from 2007 to present, inspired on the 1957–1975 model
 Fiat 500e (2013) – produced from 2013 to 2019, an electric version of the 2007–2019 model
 Fiat New 500 – presented in 2020 and introduced as an electric model and successor of the 2007–2019 model
 Fiat 500L – mini MPV produced from 2012 to present, succeeding the Multipla
 Fiat 500X – 2013 model announced in 2012 as the crossover version of the 500L

500